Marvelous is a 2006 American drama/comedy written and directed by Síofra Campbell.

Plot
Gwen (Martha Plimpton), is living with her sister Queenie (Amy Ryan) after getting divorced. Gwen has the ability to magically fix broken machinery and heal sick and injured people.

The film explores the effect that celebrity has on Gwen and her family and friends.

Cast

Critical reception
As an independent film, Marvelous did not have a great deal of critical focus. What there was, was mixed. Ronnie Scheib of Variety praised the "marvelously peculiar dialogue" and the good work of the actors. The reviewer at Moviefone.com calls it "a memorable satire." However, New York magazine found the script "uneven" and praised only the work of Ewen Bremner and referred to the work of the other actors as "overacting". MSN movies gives it three stars out of five.

References

External links

https://movies.yahoo.com/movie/1809426122/details
http://www.truveo.com/Marvelous-Trailer/id/4063822694# clip from the movie

2006 films
2006 comedy-drama films
2006 comedy films
2006 drama films
American comedy-drama films
2000s English-language films
2000s American films